Vaughn Bean (born September 3, 1974) is an American former professional boxer. Nicknamed "Shake & Bake", Bean challenged twice for world heavyweight titles in 1997 and 1998.

Professional career
Bean began his career with 27 victories over extremely limited competition, lining up a shot at IBF Heavyweight title holder Michael Moorer in 1997. At the time, Bean was a virtual unknown to the boxing public but put up a good effort against Moorer, losing a close majority decision.

After four victories over marginal competition, Bean secured another title shot against Evander Holyfield for the WBA and IBF Heavyweight titles. Bean again lost the decision. Bean again went on another synthetic winning streak, pounding out 11 consecutive wins. Yet again, he secured another major fight, this time against Vitali Klitschko. Klitchko controlled the fight, and took out the durable Bean via a TKO in the 11th round.

In 2004, Bean dropped decisions to Tony Thompson and Yanqui Diaz. In 2005, he dropped a decision to rising star Alexander Dimitrenko.

Professional boxing record

|-
|align="center" colspan=8|45 Wins (34 knockouts, 11 decisions), 6 Losses (1 knockout, 5 decisions)
|-
| align="center" style="border-style: none none solid solid; background: #e3e3e3"|Result
| align="center" style="border-style: none none solid solid; background: #e3e3e3"|Record
| align="center" style="border-style: none none solid solid; background: #e3e3e3"|Opponent
| align="center" style="border-style: none none solid solid; background: #e3e3e3"|Type
| align="center" style="border-style: none none solid solid; background: #e3e3e3"|Round
| align="center" style="border-style: none none solid solid; background: #e3e3e3"|Date
| align="center" style="border-style: none none solid solid; background: #e3e3e3"|Location
| align="center" style="border-style: none none solid solid; background: #e3e3e3"|Notes
|-align=center
|Loss
|
|align=left| Alexander Dimitrenko
|UD
|10
|28/09/2005
|align=left| Altona, Hamburg, Germany
|align=left|
|-
|Win
|
|align=left| Ken Murphy
|UD
|6
|11/02/2005
|align=left| Merrionette Park, Illinois, U.S.
|align=left|
|-
|Loss
|
|align=left| Yanqui Diaz
|SD
|10
|12/11/2004
|align=left| Green Bay, Wisconsin, U.S.
|align=left|
|-
|Loss
|
|align=left| Tony Thompson
|UD
|10
|11/09/2004
|align=left| Montreal, Quebec, Canada
|align=left|
|-
|Win
|
|align=left| Anthony Riddick
|TKO
|2
|15/11/2003
|align=left| Hammond, Indiana, U.S.
|align=left|
|-
|Win
|
|align=left| David Cherry
|TKO
|1
|19/10/2003
|align=left| Terre Haute, Indiana, U.S.
|align=left|
|-
|Loss
|
|align=left| Vitali Klitschko
|TKO
|11
|08/02/2002
|align=left| Braunschweig, Niedersachsen, Germany
|align=left|
|-
|Win
|
|align=left| Kenny Craven
|KO
|1
|08/12/2001
|align=left| Wilmington, Delaware, U.S.
|align=left|
|-
|Win
|
|align=left| Larry Carlisle
|TKO
|2
|22/09/2001
|align=left| Newark, New Jersey, U.S.
|align=left|
|-
|Win
|
|align=left| Don Normand
|TKO
|2
|12/06/2001
|align=left| Wilmington, Delaware, U.S.
|align=left|
|-
|Win
|
|align=left| Abdul Muhaymin
|UD
|10
|12/01/2001
|align=left| Atlantic City, New Jersey, U.S.
|align=left|
|-
|Win
|
|align=left| Onebo Maxime
|TKO
|2
|05/12/2000
|align=left| Wilmington, Delaware, U.S.
|align=left|
|-
|Win
|
|align=left| Robert Smith
|UD
|8
|07/10/2000
|align=left| Uncasville, Connecticut, U.S.
|align=left|
|-
|Win
|
|align=left| Jimmy Haynes
|KO
|1
|29/07/2000
|align=left| Atlantic City, New Jersey, U.S.
|align=left|
|-
|Win
|
|align=left| Tim Ray
|KO
|1
|28/04/2000
|align=left| Philadelphia, Pennsylvania, U.S.
|align=left|
|-
|Win
|
|align=left| Terry Porter
|PTS
|10
|17/03/2000
|align=left| Atlantic City, New Jersey, U.S.
|align=left|
|-
|Win
|
|align=left| Danny Wofford
|DQ
|5
|11/12/1999
|align=left| Springfield, Virginia, U.S.
|align=left|
|-
|Win
|
|align=left| Lorenzo Boyd
|TKO
|2
|24/07/1999
|align=left| South Toms River, New Jersey, U.S.
|align=left|
|-
|Loss
|
|align=left| Evander Holyfield
|UD
|12
|19/09/1998
|align=left| Atlanta, Georgia, U.S.
|align=left|
|-
|Win
|
|align=left| Lamont Burgin
|TKO
|3
|18/04/1998
|align=left| Alexandria, Virginia, U.S.
|align=left|
|-
|Win
|
|align=left| Isaac Brown
|TKO
|2
|30/01/1998
|align=left| Newark, New Jersey, U.S.
|align=left|
|-
|Win
|
|align=left| Kimmuel Odum
|TKO
|2
|18/12/1997
|align=left| Newark, New Jersey, U.S.
|align=left|
|-
|Win
|
|align=left| Bryant Smith
|TKO
|1
|29/11/1997
|align=left| Vineland, New Jersey, U.S.
|align=left|
|-
|Loss
|
|align=left| Michael Moorer
|MD
|12
|29/03/1997
|align=left| Las Vegas, Nevada, U.S.
|align=left|
|-
|Win
|
|align=left| Earl Talley
|TKO
|1
|14/12/1996
|align=left| Atlantic City, New Jersey, U.S.
|align=left|
|-
|Win
|
|align=left| Lou Turchiarelli
|TKO
|1
|20/11/1996
|align=left| Newark, New Jersey, U.S.
|align=left|
|-
|Win
|
|align=left| Ron McCarthy
|TKO
|6
|18/06/1996
|align=left| Wilmington, Delaware, U.S.
|align=left|
|-
|Win
|
|align=left| Michael Benning
|TKO
|1
|03/05/1996
|align=left| Somerset, New Jersey, U.S.
|align=left|
|-
|Win
|
|align=left| Doug Davis
|TKO
|7
|15/11/1995
|align=left| Newark, New Jersey, U.S.
|align=left|
|-
|Win
|
|align=left| Mike DeVito
|KO
|1
|19/06/1995
|align=left| Philadelphia, Pennsylvania, U.S.
|align=left|
|-
|Win
|
|align=left| Bradley Rone
|UD
|6
|06/06/1995
|align=left| Philadelphia, Pennsylvania, U.S.
|align=left|
|-
|Win
|
|align=left| Harold Johnson
|TKO
|1
|10/05/1995
|align=left| Chicago, Illinois, U.S.
|align=left|
|-
|Win
|
|align=left| Dave Slaughter
|KO
|1
|20/04/1995
|align=left| Chicago, Illinois, U.S.
|align=left|
|-
|Win
|
|align=left| Max Key
|TKO
|1
|10/02/1995
|align=left| Philadelphia, Pennsylvania, U.S.
|align=left|
|-
|Win
|
|align=left| Kevin Parker
|DQ
|4
|02/12/1994
|align=left| Philadelphia, Pennsylvania, U.S.
|align=left|
|-
|Win
|
|align=left| James Drubin
|TKO
|3
|17/11/1994
|align=left| Somerset, New Jersey, U.S.
|align=left|
|-
|Win
|
|align=left| Maurice Harris
|KO
|3
|29/10/1994
|align=left| Atlantic City, New Jersey, U.S.
|align=left|
|-
|Win
|
|align=left| Jeff Bowman
|TKO
|1
|21/07/1994
|align=left| Hasbrouck Heights, New Jersey, U.S.
|align=left|
|-
|Win
|
|align=left| Leonard Long
|TKO
|2
|17/05/1994
|align=left| Atlantic City, New Jersey, U.S.
|align=left|
|-
|Win
|
|align=left| Howard Kelly
|TKO
|3
|12/04/1994
|align=left| Philadelphia, Pennsylvania, U.S.
|align=left|
|-
|Win
|
|align=left| Marion Wilson
|UD
|6
|26/02/1994
|align=left| Atlantic City, New Jersey, U.S.
|align=left|
|-
|Win
|
|align=left| Warren Williams
|TKO
|2
|23/11/1993
|align=left| Philadelphia, Pennsylvania, U.S.
|align=left|
|-
|Win
|
|align=left| Tim Richards
|PTS
|6
|01/07/1993
|align=left| Gary, Indiana, U.S.
|align=left|
|-
|Win
|
|align=left| Matt Davis
|TKO
|1
|21/05/1993
|align=left| Gary, Indiana, U.S.
|align=left|
|-
|Win
|
|align=left| Brian Morgan
|PTS
|6
|23/04/1993
|align=left| Countryside, Illinois, U.S.
|align=left|
|-
|Win
|
|align=left| James Wilder
|PTS
|4
|26/03/1993
|align=left| Countryside, Illinois, U.S.
|align=left|
|-
|Win
|
|align=left| Matt Davis
|TKO
|1
|26/02/1993
|align=left| Countryside, Illinois, U.S.
|align=left|
|-
|Win
|
|align=left| Brian Johnson
|TKO
|3
|19/02/1993
|align=left| Countryside, Illinois, U.S.
|align=left|
|-
|Win
|
|align=left| James Virgil Holly
|KO
|1
|22/01/1993
|align=left| Countryside, Illinois, U.S.
|align=left|
|-
|Win
|
|align=left| Nate Spears
|TKO
|1
|11/12/1992
|align=left| Countryside, Illinois, U.S.
|align=left|
|-
|Win
|
|align=left|Dwight Ramsey
|KO
|2
|23/10/1992
|align=left| Countryside, Illinois, U.S.
|align=left|
|}

References

External links
 

1974 births
Heavyweight boxers
Living people
Boxers from Chicago
American male boxers
African-American boxers
21st-century African-American sportspeople
20th-century African-American sportspeople